A dust collector is a system used to enhance the quality of air released from industrial and commercial processes by collecting dust and other impurities from air or gas. Designed to handle high-volume dust loads, a dust collector system consists of a blower, dust filter, a filter-cleaning system, and a dust receptacle or dust removal system. It is distinguished from air purifiers, which use disposable filters to remove dust.

History

The father of the dust collector was Wilhelm Beth from Lübeck. In 1921, he patented three filter designs that he had pioneered to remove dust from air.

Uses
Dust collectors are used in many processes to either recover valuable granular solid or powder from process streams, or to remove granular solid pollutants from exhaust gases prior to venting to the atmosphere. Dust collection is an online process for collecting any process-generated dust from the source point on a continuous basis. Dust collectors may be of single unit construction, or a collection of devices used to separate particulate matter from the process air. They are often used as an air pollution control device to maintain or improve air quality.

Mist collectors remove particulate matter in the form of fine liquid droplets from the air. They are often used for the collection of metal working fluids, and coolant or oil mists. Mist collectors are often used to improve or maintain the quality of air in the workplace environment.

Fume and smoke collectors are used to remove sub-micrometer-size particulates from the air. They effectively reduce or eliminate particulate matter and gas streams from many industrial processes such as welding, rubber and plastic processing, high speed machining with coolants, tempering, and quenching.

Types
Five main types of industrial dust collectors are:
Inertial separators
Fabric filters
Wet scrubbers
Unit collector
Electrostatic precipitators

Inertial separators
Inertial separators separate dust from gas streams using a combination of forces, such as centrifugal, gravitational, and inertial. These forces move the dust to an area where the forces exerted by the gas stream are minimal. The separated dust is moved by gravity into a hopper, where it is temporarily stored.

The three primary types of inertial separators are:
Settling chambers
Baffle chambers
Centrifugal collectors

Neither settling chambers nor baffle chambers are commonly used in the minerals processing industry. However, their principles of operation are often incorporated into the design of more efficient dust collectors.

Settling chamber

A settling chamber (or stiveroom) consists of a large box installed in the ductwork. The increase of cross section area at the chamber reduces the speed of the dust-filled airstream and heavier particles settle out.
Settling chambers are simple in design and can be manufactured from almost any material. However, they are seldom used as primary dust collectors because of their large space requirements and low efficiency. A practical use is as precleaners for more efficient collect.
Advantages: 1) simple construction and low cost 2) maintenance free 3) collects particles without need of water. Disadvantages: 1) low efficiency 2) large space required.

Baffle chamber

Baffle chambers use a fixed baffle plate that causes the conveying gas stream to make a sudden change of direction. Large-diameter particles do not follow the gas stream but continue into a dead air space and settle. Baffle chambers are used as precleaners

Centrifugal collectors

Centrifugal collectors use cyclonic action to separate dust particles from the gas stream. In a typical cyclone, the dust gas stream enters at an angle and is spun rapidly. The centrifugal force created by the circular flow throws the dust particles toward the wall of the cyclone. After striking the wall, these particles fall into a hopper located underneath.

The most common types of centrifugal, or inertial, collectors in use today are:

Single-cyclone separators
Single-cyclone separators create a dual vortex to separate coarse from fine dust. The main vortex spirals downward and carries most of the coarser dust particles. The inner vortex, created near the bottom of the cyclone, spirals upward and carries finer dust particles.

Multiple-cyclone separators

Multiple-cyclone separators consist of a number of small-diameter cyclones, operating in parallel and having a common gas inlet and outlet, as shown in the figure, and operate on the same principle as single cyclone separators—creating an outer downward vortex and an ascending inner vortex.

Multiple-cyclone separators remove more dust than single cyclone separators because the individual cyclones have a greater length and smaller diameter. The longer length provides longer residence time while the smaller diameter creates greater centrifugal force. These two factors result in better separation of dust particulates. The pressure drop of multiple-cyclone separators collectors is higher than that of single-cyclone separators, requiring more energy to clean the same amount of air. A single-chamber cyclone separator of the same volume is more economical, but doesn't remove as much dust.

Cyclone separators are found in all types of power and industrial applications, including pulp and paper plants, cement plants, steel mills, petroleum coke plants, metallurgical plants, saw mills and other kinds of facilities that process dust.

Secondary-air-flow separators
This type of cyclone uses a secondary air flow, injected into the cyclone to accomplish several things. The secondary air flow increases the speed of the cyclonic action making the separator more efficient; it intercepts the particulate before it reaches the interior walls of the unit; and it forces the separated particulate toward the collection area. The secondary air flow protects the separator from particulate abrasion and allows the separator to be installed horizontally because gravity is not depended upon to move the separated particulate downward.

Fabric filters

Commonly known as baghouses, fabric collectors use filtration to separate dust particulates from dusty gases. They are one of the most efficient and cost-effective types of dust collectors available, and can achieve a collection efficiency of more than 99% for very fine particulates.

Dust-laden gases enter the baghouse and pass through fabric bags that act as filters. The bags can be of woven or felted cotton, synthetic, or glass-fiber material in either a tube or envelope shape.

Pre-coating
To ensure the filter bags have a long usage life they are commonly coated with a filter enhancer (pre-coat). The use of chemically inert limestone (calcium carbonate) is most common as it maximises efficiency of dust collection (including fly ash) via formation of what is called a dustcake or coating on the surface of the filter media. This not only traps fine particulates but also provides protection for the bag itself from moisture, and oily or sticky particulates which can bind the filter media. Without a pre-coat the filter bag allows fine particulates to bleed through the bag filter system, especially during start-up, as the bag can only do part of the filtration leaving the finer parts to the filter enhancer dustcake.

Parts
Fabric filters generally have the following parts:
 Clean plenum
 Dusty plenum
 Bag, cage, venturi assembly
 Tubeplate
 RAV/SCREW
 Compressed air header
 Blow pipe
 Housing and hopper

Types of bag cleaning
Baghouses are characterized by their cleaning method.

Shaking
A rod connecting to the bag is powered by a motor. This provides motion to remove caked-on particles. The speed and motion of the shaking depends on the design of the bag and composition of the particulate matter. Generally shaking is horizontal. The top of the bag is closed and the bottom is open. When shaken, the dust collected on the inside of the bag is freed. No dirty gas flows through a bag while it is being cleaned. This redirection of air flow illustrates why baghouses must be compartmentalized.

Reverse air
Air flow gives the bag structure. Dirty air flows through the bag from the inside, allowing dust to collect on the interior surface. During cleaning, gas flow is restricted from a specific compartment. Without the flowing air, the bags relax. The cylindrical bag contains rings that prevent it from completely collapsing under the pressure of the air. A fan blows clean air in the reverse direction. The relaxation and reverse air flow cause the dust cake to crumble and release into the hopper. Upon the completion of the cleaning process, dirty air flow continues and the bag regains its shape.

Pulse jet
This type of baghouse cleaning (also known as pressure-jet cleaning) is the most common. It was invented and patented by MikroPul in 1956.  A high pressure blast of air is used to remove dust from the bag. The blast enters the top of the bag tube, temporarily ceasing the flow of dirty air. The shock of air causes a wave of expansion to travel down the fabric. The flexing of the bag shatters and discharges the dust cake.
The air burst is about 0.1 second and it takes about 0.5 seconds for the shock wave to travel down the length of the bag. Due to its rapid release, the blast of air does not interfere with contaminated gas flow. Therefore, pulse-jet baghouses can operate continuously and are not usually compartmentalized.
The blast of compressed air must be powerful enough to ensure that the shock wave will travel the entire length of the bag and fracture the dust cake.
The efficiency of the cleaning system allows the unit to have a much higher gas to cloth ratio (or volumetric throughput of gas per unit area of filter) than shaking and reverse air bag filters. This kind of filter thus requires a smaller area to admit the same volume of air.

Sonic
The least common type of cleaning method is sonic. Shaking is achieved by sonic vibration. A sound generator produces a low frequency sound that causes the bags to vibrate. Sonic cleaning is commonly combined with another method of cleaning to ensure thorough cleaning.

Rotating cage
Although the principles of this method are basic, the rotating mechanical cage cleaning method is relatively new to the international market. This method can be visualized by reminding users of putting a floor covering rug on a clothes line and beating the dust out of it.  The rotating cage consists of a cage with fixed position holding the filter bag.  Nested inside the cage holding the bag is a secondary cage that is allowed to rotate 90 degrees.  This rotating action can be as adjusted to meet desired whipping effect on the inside of the bag.

Cartridge collectors
Cartridge collectors use perforated metal cartridges that contain a pleated, nonwoven filtering media, as opposed to woven or felt bags used in baghouses. The pleated design allows for a greater total filtering surface area than in a conventional bag of the same diameter, The greater filtering area results in a reduced air to media ratio, pressure drop, and overall collector size.

Cartridge collectors are available in single use or continuous duty designs. In single-use collectors, the dirty cartridges are changed and collected dirt is removed while the collector is off. In the continuous duty design, the cartridges are cleaned by the conventional pulse-jet cleaning system.

Wet scrubbers

Dust collectors that use liquid are known as wet scrubbers. In these systems, the scrubbing liquid (usually water) comes into contact with a gas stream containing dust particles. Greater contact of the gas and liquid streams yields higher dust removal efficiency.

There is a large variety of wet scrubbers; however, all have one of three basic configurations:

1. Gas-humidification - The gas-humidification process agglomerates fine particles, increasing the bulk, making collection easier.

2. Gas-liquid contact - This is one of the most important factors affecting collection efficiency. The particle and droplet come into contact by four primary mechanisms:
a) Inertial impaction - When water droplets placed in the path of a dust-laden gas stream, the stream separates and flows around them. Due to inertia, the larger dust particles will continue on in a straight path, hit the droplets, and become encapsulated.
b) Interception - Finer particles moving within a gas stream do not hit droplets directly but brush against and adhere to them.
c) Diffusion - When liquid droplets are scattered among dust particles, the particles are deposited on the droplet surfaces by Brownian movement, or diffusion. This is the principal mechanism in the collection of submicrometre dust particles.
d) Condensation nucleation - If a gas passing through a scrubber is cooled below the dewpoint, condensation of moisture occurs on the dust particles. This increase in particle size makes collection easier.

3. Gas-liquid separation - Regardless of the contact mechanism used, as much liquid and dust as possible must be removed. Once contact is made, dust particulates and water droplets combine to form agglomerates. As the agglomerates grow larger, they settle into a collector.

The "cleaned" gases are normally passed through a mist eliminator (demister pads) to remove water droplets from the gas stream. The dirty water from the scrubber system is either cleaned and discharged or recycled to the scrubber. Dust is removed from the scrubber in a clarification unit or a drag chain tank. In both systems solid material settles on the bottom of the tank. A drag chain conveyor system removes the sludge and deposits in into a dumpster or stockpile.

Types of scrubbers
Spray-tower scrubber wet scrubbers may be categorized by pressure drop as follows:

Low-energy scrubbers (0.5 to 2.5 inches water gauge - 124.4 to 621.9 Pa)
Low- to medium-energy scrubbers (2.5 to 6 inches water gauge - 0.622 to 1.493 kPa)
Medium- to high-energy scrubbers (6 to 15 inches water gauge - 1.493 to 3.731 kPa)
High-energy scrubbers (greater than 15 inches water gauge - greater than 3.731 kPa)

Due to the large number of commercial scrubbers available, it is not possible to describe each individual type here. However, the following sections provide examples of typical scrubbers in each category.

Low-energy scrubbers
In the simple, gravity-spray-tower scrubber, liquid droplets formed by liquid atomized in spray nozzles fall through rising exhaust gases. Dirty water is drained at the bottom.

These scrubbers operated at pressure drops of 1 to 2 in. water gauge (¼ to ½ kPa) and are approximately 70% efficient on 10 µm particles. Their efficiency is poor below 10 µm. However, they are capable of treating relatively high dust concentrations without becoming plugged.

Low- to medium-energy scrubbers
Wet cyclones use centrifugal force to spin the dust particles (similar to a cyclone), and throw the particulates upon the collector's wetted walls. Water introduced from the top to wet the cyclone walls carries these particles away. The wetted walls also prevent dust reentrainment.

Pressure drops for these collectors range from 2 to 8 in. water (½ to 2 kPa), and the collection efficiency is good for 5 μm particles and above.

High-energy scrubbers co-current-flow scrubber
Packed-bed scrubbers consist of beds of packing elements, such as coke, broken rock, rings, saddles, or other manufactured elements. The packing breaks down the liquid flow into a high-surface-area film so that the dusty gas streams passing through the bed achieve maximum contact with the liquid film and become deposited on the surfaces of the packing elements. These scrubbers have a good collection efficiency for respirable dust.

Three types of packed-bed scrubbers are:
Cross-flow scrubbers
Co-current flow scrubbers
Counter-current flow scrubbers

Efficiency can be greatly increased by minimizing target size, i.e., using 0.003 in. (0.076 mm) diameter stainless steel wire and increasing gas velocity to more than 1,800 ft/min (9.14 m/s).

High-energy scrubbers
Venturi scrubbers consist of a venturi-shaped inlet and separator. The dust-laden gases venturi scrubber enter through the venturi and are accelerated to speeds between 12,000 and 36,000 ft/min (60.97-182.83 m/s). These high-gas velocities immediately atomize the coarse water spray, which is injected radially into the venturi throat, into fine droplets. High energy and extreme turbulence promote collision between water droplets and dust particulates in the throat. The agglomeration process between particle and droplet continues in the diverging section of the venturi. The large agglomerates formed in the venturi are then removed by an inertial separator.

Venturi scrubbers achieve very high collection efficiencies for respirable dust. Since efficiency of a venturi scrubber depends on pressure drop, some manufacturers supply a variable-throat venturi to maintain pressure drop with varying gas flows.

Electrostatic precipitators (ESP)

Electrostatic precipitators use electrostatic forces to separate dust particles from exhaust gases. A number of high-voltage, direct-current discharge electrodes are placed between grounded collecting electrodes. The contaminated gases flow through the passage formed by the discharge and collecting electrodes. Electrostatic precipitators operate on the same principle as home "Ionic" air purifiers.

The airborne particles receive a negative charge as they pass through the ionized field between the electrodes. These charged particles are then attracted to a grounded or positively charged electrode and adhere to it.

The collected material on the electrodes is removed by rapping or vibrating the collecting electrodes either continuously or at a predetermined interval. Cleaning a precipitator can usually be done without interrupting the airflow.

The four main components of all electrostatic precipitators are:
Power supply unit, to provide high-voltage DC power
Ionizing section, to impart a charge to particulates in the gas stream
A means of removing the collected particulates
A housing to enclose the precipitator zone

The following factors affect the efficiency of electrostatic precipitators:
Larger collection-surface areas and lower gas-flow rates increase efficiency because of the increased time available for electrical activity to treat the dust particles.
An increase in the dust-particle migration velocity to the collecting electrodes increases efficiency. The migration velocity can be increased by:
Decreasing the gas viscosity
Increasing the gas temperature
Increasing the voltage field

Types of precipitators
There are two main types of precipitators:
High-voltage, single-stage - Single-stage precipitators combine an ionization and a collection step. They are commonly referred to as Cottrell precipitators.
Low-voltage, two-stage - Two-stage precipitators use a similar principle; however, the ionizing section is followed by collection plates.

Described below is the high-voltage, single-stage precipitator, which is widely used in minerals processing operations. The low-voltage, two-stage precipitator is generally used for filtration in air-conditioning systems.

Plate precipitators
The majority of electrostatic precipitators installed are the plate type. Particles are collected on flat, parallel surfaces that are 8 to 12 in. (20 to 30 cm) apart, with a series of discharge electrodes spaced along the centerline of two adjacent plates. The contaminated gases pass through the passage between the plates, and the particles become charged and adhere to the collection plates. Collected particles are usually removed by rapping the plates and deposited in bins or hoppers at the base of the precipitator.

Tubular precipitators
Tubular precipitators consist of cylindrical collection electrodes with discharge electrodes located on the axis of the cylinder. The contaminated gases flow around the discharge electrode and up through the inside of the cylinders. The charged particles are collected on the grounded walls of the cylinder. The collected dust is removed from the bottom of the cylinder.

Tubular precipitators are often used for mist or fog collection or for adhesive, sticky, radioactive, or extremely toxic materials.

Unit collectors
Unlike central collectors, unit collectors control contamination at its source. They are small and self-contained, consisting of a fan and some form of dust collector. They are suitable for isolated, portable, or frequently moved dust-producing operations, such as bins and silos or remote belt-conveyor transfer points. Advantages of unit collectors include small space requirements, the return of collected dust to main material flow, and low initial cost. However, their dust-holding and storage capacities, servicing facilities, and maintenance periods have been sacrificed.

A number of designs are available, with capacities ranging from 200 to 2,000 ft³/min (90 to 900 L/s). There are two main types of unit collectors:
Fabric collectors, with manual shaking or pulse-jet cleaning - normally used for fine dust
Cyclone collectors - normally used for coarse dust

Fabric collectors are frequently used in minerals processing operations because they provide high collection efficiency and uninterrupted exhaust airflow between cleaning cycles. Cyclone collectors are used when coarser dust is generated, as in woodworking, metal grinding, or machining.

The following points should be considered when selecting a unit collector:
Cleaning efficiency must comply with all applicable regulations.
The unit maintains its rated capacity while accumulating large amounts of dust between cleanings.
Simple cleaning operations do not increase the surrounding dust concentration.
Has the ability to operate unattended for extended periods of time (for example, 8 hours).
Automatic discharge or sufficient dust storage space to hold at least one week's accumulation.
If renewable filters are used, they should not have to be replaced more than once a month.
Durable
Quiet

Use of unit collectors may not be appropriate if the dust-producing operations are located in an area where central exhaust systems would be practical. Dust removal and servicing requirements are expensive for many unit collectors and are more likely to be neglected than those for a single, large collector.

Selecting a dust collector
Dust collectors vary widely in design, operation, effectiveness, space requirements, construction, and capital, operating, and maintenance costs. Each type has advantages and disadvantages. However, the selection of a dust collector should be based on the following general factors:

Degree of dust collection required – The degree of dust collection required depends on its potential as a health hazard or public nuisance, the plant location, the allowable emission rate, the nature of the dust, its salvage value, and so forth. The selection of a collector should be based on the efficiency required and should consider the need for high-efficiency, high-cost equipment, such as electrostatic precipitators; high-efficiency, moderate-cost equipment, such as baghouses or wet scrubbers; or lower cost, primary units, such as dry centrifugal collectors.
Characteristics of airstream – The characteristics of the airstream can have a significant impact on collector selection. For example, cotton fabric filters cannot be used where air temperatures exceed 180 °F (82 °C). Also, condensation of steam or water vapor can blind bags. Various chemicals can attack fabric or metal and cause corrosion in wet scrubbers.
Characteristics of dust – Moderate to heavy concentrations of many dusts (such as dust from silica sand or metal ores) can be abrasive to dry centrifugal collectors. Hygroscopic material can blind bag collectors. Sticky material can adhere to collector elements and plug passages. Some particle sizes and shapes may rule out certain types of fabric collectors. The combustible nature of many fine materials rules out the use of electrostatic precipitators.
Methods of disposal – Methods of dust removal and disposal vary with the material, plant process, volume, and type of collector used. Collectors can unload continuously or in batches. Dry materials can create secondary dust problems during unloading and disposal that do not occur with wet collectors. Disposal of wet slurry or sludge can be an additional material-handling problem; sewer or water pollution problems can result if wastewater is not treated properly.
Choosing the right size dust collector depends on airflow volume and air-to-cloth ratio that determine the efficiency of a system. Optimal dust collecting equipment increases employee retention and preserves equipment that helps lower maintenance and replacement costs. 
Choosing a too-large, undersized, or incapable dust collector can cause plenty of issues that impact performance and maintenance costs. Hence, the dust collector should be chosen in such a way that suits the company’s specific workplace. 
It must provide a safe and healthy work environment for the employees. Moreover, employee efficiency and production should not ignore.

Fan and motor
The fan and motor system supplies mechanical energy to move contaminated air from the dust-producing source to a dust collector.

Types of fans
There are two main kinds of industrial fans:

Centrifugal fans
Axial-flow fans

Centrifugal fans
Centrifugal fans consist of a wheel or a rotor mounted on a shaft that rotates in a scroll-shaped housing. Air enters at the eye of the rotor, makes a right-angle turn, and is forced through the blades of the rotor by centrifugal force into the scroll-shaped housing. The centrifugal force imparts static pressure to the air. The diverging shape of the scroll also converts a portion of the velocity pressure into static pressure.

There are three main types of centrifugal fans:

Radial-blade fans - Radial-blade fans are used for heavy dust loads. Their straight, radial blades do not get clogged with material, and they withstand considerable abrasion. These fans have medium tip speeds and medium noise factors.
Backward-blade fans - Backward-blade fans operate at higher tip speeds and thus are more efficient. Since material may build up on the blades, these fans should be used after a dust collector. Although they are noisier than radial-blade fans, backward-blade fans are commonly used for large-volume dust collection systems because of their higher efficiency.
Forward-curved-blade fans - These fans have curved blades that are tipped in the direction of rotation. They have low space requirements, low tip speeds, and a low noise factor. They are usually used against low to moderate static pressures.

Axial-flow fans
Axial-flow fans are used in systems that have low resistance levels. These fans move the air parallel to the fan's axis of rotation. The screw-like action of the propellers moves the air in a straight-through parallel path, causing a helical flow pattern.

The three main kinds of axial fans are:

Propeller fans - These fans are used to move large quantities of air against very low static pressures. They are usually used for general ventilation or dilution ventilation and are good in developing up to 0.5 in. wg (124.4 Pa).
Tube-axial fans - Tube-axial fans are similar to propeller fans except they are mounted in a tube or cylinder. Therefore, they are more efficient than propeller fans and can develop up to 3 to 4 in. wg (743.3 to 995 Pa). They are best suited for moving air containing substances such as condensible fumes or pigments.
Vane-axial fans - Vane-axial fans are similar to tube-axial fans except air-straightening vanes are installed on the suction or discharge side of the rotor. They are easily adapted to multistaging and can develop static pressures as high as 14 to 16 in. wg (3.483 to 3.98 kPa). They are normally used for clean air only.

Electric motors

Electric motors are used to supply the necessary energy to drive the fan.

Motors are selected to provide sufficient power to operate fans over the full range of process conditions (temperature and flow rate).

Configurations
Dust collectors can be configured into one of five common types:
 Ambient units - Ambient units are free-hanging systems for use when applications limit the use of source-capture arms or ductwork.
 Collection booths - Collector booths require no ductwork, and allow the worker greater freedom of movement. They are often portable.
 Downdraft tables - A downdraft table is a self-contained portable filtration system that removes harmful particulates and returns filtered air back into the facility with no external ventilation required.
 Source collector or Portable units - Portable units are for collecting dust, mist, fumes, or smoke at the source.
 Stationary units - An example of a stationary collector is a baghouse.

Parameters involved in specifying dust collectors
Important parameters in specifying dust collectors include airflow the velocity of the air stream created by the vacuum producer; system power, the power of the system motor, usually specified in horsepower; storage capacity for dust and particles, and minimum particle size filtered by the unit. Other considerations when choosing a dust collection system include the temperature, moisture content, and the possibility of combustion of the dust being collected.

Systems for fine removal may only contain a single filtration system (such as a filter bag or cartridge). However, most units utilize a primary and secondary separation/filtration system. In many cases the heat or moisture content of dust can negatively affect the filter media of a baghouse or cartridge dust collector. A cyclone separator or dryer may be placed before these units to reduce heat or moisture content before reaching the filters. Furthermore, some units may have third and fourth stage filtration. All separation and filtration systems used within the unit should be specified.

A baghouse is an air pollution abatement device used to trap particulate by filtering gas streams through large fabric bags. They are typically made of glass fibers or fabric.

A cyclone separator is an apparatus for the separation, by centrifugal means, of fine particles suspended in air or gas.

Electrostatic precipitators are a type of air cleaner, which charges particles of dust by passing dust-laden air through a strong (50-100 kV) electrostatic field. This causes the particles to be attracted to oppositely charged plates so that they can be removed from the air stream.

An impinger system is a device in which particles are removed by impacting the aerosol particles into a liquid. Modular media type units combine a variety of specific filter modules in one unit. These systems can provide solutions to many air contaminant problems. A typical system incorporates a series of disposable or cleanable pre-filters, a disposable vee-bag or cartridge filter. HEPA or carbon final filter modules can also be added. Various models are available, including free-hanging or ducted installations, vertical or horizontal mounting, and fixed or portable configurations. Filter cartridges are made out of a variety of synthetic fibers and are capable of collecting sub-micrometre particles without creating an excessive pressure drop in the system. Filter cartridges require periodic cleaning.

A wet scrubber, or venturi scrubber, is similar to a cyclone but it has an orifice unit that sprays water into the vortex in the cyclone section, collecting all of the dust in a slurry system. The water media can be recirculated and reused to continue to filter the air. Eventually the solids must be removed from the water stream and disposed of.

Filter cleaning methods
Online cleaning – automatically timed filter cleaning which allows for continuous, uninterrupted dust collector operation for heavy dust operations.

Offline cleaning – filter cleaning accomplished during dust collector shut down. Practical whenever the dust loading in each dust collector cycle does not exceed the filter capacity. Allows for maximum effectiveness in dislodging and disposing of dust.

On-demand cleaning – filter cleaning initiated automatically when the filter is fully loaded, as determined by a specified drop in pressure across the media surface.

Reverse-pulse/Reverse-jet cleaning – Filter cleaning method which delivers blasts of compressed air from the clean side of the filter to dislodge the accumulated dust cake.

Impact/Rapper cleaning – Filter cleaning method in which high-velocity compressed air forced through a flexible tube results in an arbitrary rapping of the filter to dislodge the dust cake. Especially effective when the dust is extremely fine or sticky.

See also
Axial fan design

References

External links

EPA Air Pollutants and Control Techniques Additional information on various wet scrubber topologies and techniques

Dust
Air filters
Particulate control
Solid-gas separation